The European Democratic Union Group was a Gaullist political group with seats in the European Parliament between 1965 and 1973.

History
The French Gaullists split from the Liberal Group on 21 January 1965 and created a new Group called the "European Democratic Union", (not to be confused with the association of Conservative and Christian Democrat parties founded in 1978 called the "European Democrat Union" or "EDU", nor the Conservative Group called the "European Democratic Group" founded in 1979). The Group was renamed on 16 January 1973 to the "Group of European Progressive Democrats" when the Gaullists were joined by the Irish Fianna Fáil.

Sources
Archive of European Integration
Konrad-Adenauer-Stiftung
Europe Politique
European Parliament MEP Archives
Centre Virtuel de la Connaissance sur l'Europe (CVCE) via European NAvigator

References

Former European Parliament party groups
Conservatism in Europe
Pan-European political parties